The Arrondissement of Brioude is an arrondissement of France in the Haute-Loire department in the Auvergne-Rhône-Alpes region. It has 111 communes.

Composition

The communes of the arrondissement of Brioude are:

Agnat
Ally
Arlet
Aubazat
Autrac
Auvers
Auzon
Azérat
Beaumont
Berbezit
La Besseyre-Saint-Mary
Blassac
Blesle
Bonneval
Bournoncle-Saint-Pierre
Brioude
Cerzat
La Chaise-Dieu
Chambezon
Champagnac-le-Vieux
Chanaleilles
Chaniat
Chanteuges
La Chapelle-Geneste
Charraix
Chassagnes
Chassignolles
Chastel
Chavaniac-Lafayette
Chazelles
Chilhac
La Chomette
Cistrières
Cohade
Collat
Connangles
Couteuges
Cronce
Cubelles
Desges
Domeyrat
Espalem
Esplantas-Vazeilles
Félines
Ferrussac
Fontannes
Frugerès-les-Mines
Frugières-le-Pin
Grenier-Montgon
Grèzes
Javaugues
Jax
Josat
Lamothe
Langeac
Laval-sur-Doulon
Lavaudieu
Lavoûte-Chilhac
Lempdes-sur-Allagnon
Léotoing
Lorlanges
Lubilhac
Malvières
Mazerat-Aurouze
Mazeyrat-d'Allier
Mercœur
Monistrol-d'Allier
Montclard
Paulhac
Paulhaguet
Pébrac
Pinols
Prades
Saint-Arcons-d'Allier
Saint-Austremoine
Saint-Beauzire
Saint-Bérain
Saint-Christophe-d'Allier
Saint-Cirgues
Saint-Didier-sur-Doulon
Sainte-Eugénie-de-Villeneuve
Sainte-Florine
Sainte-Marguerite
Saint-Étienne-sur-Blesle
Saint-Georges-d'Aurac
Saint-Géron
Saint-Hilaire
Saint-Ilpize
Saint-Julien-des-Chazes
Saint-Just-près-Brioude
Saint-Laurent-Chabreuges
Saint-Pal-de-Senouire
Saint-Préjet-Armandon
Saint-Préjet-d'Allier
Saint-Privat-du-Dragon
Saint-Vénérand
Saint-Vert
Salzuit
Saugues
Sembadel
Siaugues-Sainte-Marie
Tailhac
Thoras
Torsiac
Vals-le-Chastel
Venteuges
Vergongheon
Vézézoux
Vieille-Brioude
Villeneuve-d'Allier
Vissac-Auteyrac

History

The arrondissement of Brioude was created in 1800. In 2007 it absorbed the canton of Saugues from the arrondissement of Le Puy-en-Velay.

As a result of the reorganisation of the cantons of France which came into effect in 2015, the borders of the cantons are no longer related to the borders of the arrondissements. The cantons of the arrondissement of Brioude were, as of January 2015:

 Auzon
 Blesle
 Brioude-Nord
 Brioude-Sud
 La Chaise-Dieu
 Langeac
 Lavoûte-Chilhac
 Paulhaguet
 Pinols
 Saugues

References

Brioude